Clay County is the name of 18 counties in the United States. Most are named for Henry Clay, U.S. Senator and statesman:

 Clay County, Alabama
 Clay County, Arkansas (named for John Clayton, and originally named Clayton County)
 Clay County, Florida
 Clay County, Georgia
 Clay County, Illinois
 Clay County, Indiana
 Clay County, Iowa (named for Henry Clay Jr., son of Henry Clay and a soldier in the Mexican–American War)
 Clay County, Kansas
 Clay County, Kentucky (named for Green Clay, cousin of Henry Clay, a member of the Kentucky state legislature)
 Clay County, Minnesota
 Clay County, Mississippi
 Clay County, Missouri
 Clay County, Nebraska
 Clay County, North Carolina
 Clay County, South Dakota
 Clay County, Tennessee
 Clay County, Texas
 Clay County, West Virginia

County name disambiguation pages